Union Township is a township in Dallas County, Iowa, USA.  As of the 2000 census, its population was 2,146.

Geography
According to the USGS, it contains five cemeteries: Bear Creek, Dexter, Pleasant Hill, Spillers and Wiscotta.

The stream of Middle Raccoon River runs through this township.

References
 USGS Geographic Names Information System (GNIS)

External links
 US-Counties.com
 City-Data.com

Townships in Dallas County, Iowa
Townships in Iowa